D'scover Tour is the debut concert tour and first Japanese tour by South Korean singer Daesung, member of Big Bang. The tour was directed by Daesung himself. It was originally planned as an concert series in Kobe and Tokyo, but after high demand for tickets, a national tour was announced. In total, 300,000 fans applied for the 102,000 additional tickets that were put to sale. All concerts were sold out.

History
On December 2012, it was announced that Daesung would hold a total of four concerts at Kobe and Tokyo to promote his new album D'scover.  However, on February 28, 2013, it was announced that due to high demand, he would be holding an additional 21 concerts over 17 cities, bringing the total to 25 concerts over 18 cities. The concert tour began on March 23 at Kobe's World Memorial Hall and ended on June 18 at Kanagawa's Yokohama Arena.

Set list
 Singer's Ballad
 Love
 Sunny Hill
 Powerful Boy
 Wings
 Like Overflowing with Kindness
 Missing You Now
 The Flower Bud Of My Dream
 Try Smiling
 Map Of The Future II
 Mr. Children
 Konayuki
 Baby Don’t Cry
 Joyful
 Sobakasu

Encore
 Look at Me, Gwisoon
 Joyful
 Wings

Tour dates

References

External links
Official Site
YG Entertainment
Big Bang Japan Official Site

2013 concert tours
Daesung concert tours